Nicholas Cresswell (5 January 1750 – 26 July 1804) was an English diarist.

Cresswell was the son of a landowner and sheep farmer in Crowden-le-Booth, Edale, Derbyshire. At the age of 24, he sailed to the American colonies after becoming acquainted with a native of Edale, who was now resident in Alexandria, Virginia. For the next three years he kept a journal of his experiences, along with comments on political and social issues. He described slaves in Maryland dancing to a banjo, fashioned out a gourd, as "something in the imitation of a guitar, with only four strings".   He became unpopular due to his opposition to the independence cause in the American War of Independence. Cresswell returned to England, and after a failed attempt to receive a commission from the ex-governor of Virginia, John Murray, 4th Earl of Dunmore, he returned to Edale to resume farming.

He died in Idridgehay in 1804.

References

Further reading
The Journal of Nicholas Cresswell, 1774–1777 (1924, with a preface by S. Thornely).
The Journal of Nicholas Cresswell, 1774–1777 (New York, 1928, second edition, with an introduction by A. G. Bradley).
The Journal of Nicholas Cresswell, 1774–1777 (Townsends; Feb 2018)
H. B. Gill, ‘Nicholas Cresswell acted like a British spy. But was he?’, Colonial Williamsburg, 16 (1993), pp. 26–30.
G. M. Curtis and H. B. Gill, ‘A man apart: Nicholas Cresswell's American odyssey, 1774–1777’, Indiana Magazine of History, 96 (2000), pp. 169–90.
Harold B. Gill, Jr. and George M. Curtis III, editors, "A Man Apart: The Journal of Nicholas Cresswell, 1774-1781" (Lanham, MD: Lexington Books, Rowman & Littlefield, 2009).

External links
 

1750 births
1804 deaths
English diarists
People from Edale
18th-century diarists